Bride of the Devil is the seventeenth album by Detroit rock band Electric Six and the fourteenth in their official canon.

This is considered the band's most aggressive album giving it almost a full metal sound.

Track listing
All songs written by Electric Six.

 "The Opener" – 3:01
 "Daddy's Boy" – 3:04
 "(It Gets) (A Little) Jumpy" – 2:35
 "Safety Girl" – 3:02
 "You're Toast" – 3:21
 "Hades Ladies" – 3:14
 "Bride of the Devil" – 3:08
 "Witches Burning" – 3:01
 "Full Moon over the Internet" – 3:20
 "Grey Areas" – 3:06
 "The Worm in the Wood" – 3:14

Personnel

Electric Six
 Dick Valentine - vocals
  - lead guitar
 Da Vé - rhythm guitar
 Rob Lower - bass
 Tait Nucleus? - keyboards

Additional personnel
 Tude Glase - drums
 Holspolo
 Herb S. Flavorings

References

2018 albums
Electric Six albums
Metropolis Records albums